Isaiah 6 is the sixth chapter of the Book of Isaiah in the Hebrew Bible or the Old Testament of the Christian Bible. This book contains the prophecies attributed to the prophet Isaiah, and is one of the Books of the Prophets. It records the calling of Isaiah to be the messenger of God to the people of Israel.

Text 
The original text was written in Hebrew language. This chapter is divided into 13 verses.

Textual witnesses
Some early manuscripts containing the text of this chapter in Hebrew are of the Masoretic Text tradition, which includes the Codex Cairensis (895), the Petersburg Codex of the Prophets (916), Aleppo Codex (10th century), Codex Leningradensis (1008).

Fragments containing parts of this chapter were found among the Dead Sea Scrolls (3rd century BCE or later):
 1QIsaa: complete
 4QIsaa (4Q55): extant: verses 4–7
 4QIsaf (4Q60): extant: verses 3–8, 10–13

There is also a translation into Koine Greek known as the Septuagint, made in the last few centuries BCE. Extant ancient manuscripts of the Septuagint version include Codex Vaticanus (B; B; 4th century), Codex Sinaiticus (S; BHK: S; 4th century), Codex Alexandrinus (A; A; 5th century) and Codex Marchalianus (Q; Q; 6th century).

Old Testament references
 : ;

New Testament references
 : ; ; ; ; ; .

Parashot
The parashah sections listed here are based on the Aleppo Codex. Isaiah 6 is a part of the Prophecies about Judah and Israel (Isaiah 1–12). {P}: open parashah.
 {P} 6:1–13 {P}

In Jewish Worship, the entire Isaiah 6 is part of the prophetic reading (Haftarah) on the Sabbath when Parasha Ytro, which includes the Ten Commandments, is read from the Torah.

Isaiah's vision of the Lord (6:1–7)

Verse 1
 In the year that King Uzziah died, I saw the Lord sitting on a throne, high and lifted up, and the train of His robe filled the temple.
Cross reference: 
The date of the death of Uzziah has been estimated as around 740 BCE. Archaeologist William F. Albright dated Uzziah's reign to 783 – 742 BCE.

Verse 2

Above him stood the seraphim. Each had six wings: with two he covered his face, and with two he covered his feet, and with two he flew.
"Seraphim": described here as the 'messengers in the divine council', but has no real biblical parallel. The root word ś-r-p, for Seraph, gives a portrayal of the 'burning ones'.

Verse 3
 And one called to another and said:
"Holy, holy, holy is the Lord of hosts;
the whole earth is full of his glory!"
This verse is repeated several times in daily Jewish services, including the Kedushah prayer during the repetition of the Amidah, and is part of the Sanctus in Christian Eucharistic Prayer.

Isaiah's commission from the Lord (6:8–13)

Verse 8
 Also I heard the voice of the Lord, saying,
 Whom shall I send, 
 and who will go for us? 
 Then said I, 
 Here am I; send me.
"Us": the plural form refers to 'the entire divine assembly'.
The Jerusalem Bible notes Abraham and Isaiah as examples of biblical characters who readily respond, and contrasts them with Moses and Jeremiah, whose response is hesitant.

Verse 13
 "But yet a tenth will be in it,
 And will return and be for consuming,
 As a terebinth tree or as an oak,
 Whose stump remains when it is cut down.
 So the holy seed shall be its stump."
Cross reference: Isaiah 4:2; Isaiah 11:1; Isaiah 53:2; Jeremiah 23:5

See also
Jerusalem of Gold
Seraphim
Temple in Jerusalem
Throne of God
Uzziah, king of Judah
Related Bible parts: 2 Chronicles 26; Matthew 13; Mark 4; Luke 8; John 12; Acts 28; Romans 11

Notes and references

Sources

External links

Jewish
Isaiah 6: Hebrew with Parallel English

Christian
Isaiah 6 English Translation with Parallel Latin Vulgate
What is the Real meaning of Isaiah 6:8?

06